The 1990–91 Honduran Liga Nacional season was the 25th edition of the Honduran Liga Nacional.  The format of the tournament consisted of a three round-robin schedule followed by a 5-team playoff round.  Real C.D. España won the title after defeating C.D. Motagua in the finals.  Both teams qualified to the 1991 CONCACAF Champions' Cup.

1990–91 teams

 Curacao (Tegucigalpa)
 Marathón (San Pedro Sula)
 Motagua (Tegucigalpa)
 Olimpia (Tegucigalpa)
 Real España (San Pedro Sula)
 Sula (La Lima)
 Súper Estrella (Danlí)
 Tela Timsa (Tela, promoted)
 Victoria (La Ceiba)
 Vida (La Ceiba)

 Platense played their home games at Estadio Francisco Morazán due to renovations at Estadio Excélsior.

Regular season

Standings

Final round

Pentagonal standings

Replay

 Motagua qualified to the Final.

Final

Top scorer
  Luis Orlando Vallejo (Real España) with 12 goals

Squads

Known results

Round 1

Pentagonal

Unknown rounds

References

Liga Nacional de Fútbol Profesional de Honduras seasons
1990–91 in Honduran football
Honduras